Haworth Mesa is an ice-capped mesa with steep rock walls whose summit area is  long and  wide and rises to , standing between Sisco Mesa and Mount McNaughton where it forms part of the divide between Norfolk Glacier and Olentangy Glacier in the western Wisconsin Range of Antarctica. It was mapped by the United States Geological Survey from surveys and U.S. Navy air photos, 1960–1964, and was named by the Advisory Committee on Antarctic Names for Leland J. Haworth, Director of the National Science Foundation and a member of the Antarctic Policy Group.

References

Mesas of Antarctica
Landforms of Marie Byrd Land